"Southern California" is a song written by George Richey, Billy Sherrill and Roger Bowling, recorded by American country music artists George Jones and Tammy Wynette.  It was released in June 1977 as the first single from their Greatest Hits.  The reached number five on the Billboard country chart.

Background
Although George Jones and Tammy Wynette divorced in 1975, they enjoyed their biggest commercial successes together in the two years that followed. In 1976, Epic released the duets, "Golden Ring" and "Near You", which both became number-one hits. The couple were forced to make appearances together because the demand for concert bookings with either Tammy or George fell off drastically after they split, with an often ill Tammy finding herself strangely uncomfortable in front of disappointed and often angry audience members, a few of whom never failed to holler and scream, even in the middle of one of her songs: 'Where's George!?'" Despite the acrimony between them, Jones and Wynette were compelled to record and even perform together, leaving fans wondering if they might reconcile.

Recording and composition
"Southern California" was written by producer Billy Sherrill, Roger Bowling, and George Richey, whom Wynette would marry in 1978. The song tells the story of a woman who leaves her lover in Tennessee to follow her dream of moving to Southern California and becoming a star.  She believes that "silver screens  and limousines" are waiting for her, but her lover cautions that "I'll be here to keep your heart with me in Tennessee."  Five years later both the man and the woman regret the decision, heartbroken and wondering if the other is happy.  Following a sweeping, panoramic bridge, Jones and Wynette each deliver a recitation. The song was included on the 1977 LP Greatest Hits.

Charts

References

1977 singles
George Jones songs
Tammy Wynette songs
Songs written by George Jones
Songs written by George Richey
Song recordings produced by Billy Sherrill
Epic Records singles
Male–female vocal duets
1977 songs
Songs written by Roger Bowling (songwriter)